Shayne Campbell (born November 18, 1972) is a former Canadian soccer player who played in Canadian National Soccer League, USL A-League, National Professional Soccer League, Major Indoor Soccer League, and the Canadian Professional Soccer League.

Playing career 
Campbell began his career in 1994 with St. Catharines Wolves of the Canadian National Soccer League. In 1995, he helped the club achieve a treble, winning the Umbro Cup by defeating the Scarborough Astros on a penalty shootout. In the playoff finals the Wolves defeated the Toronto Jets by a score of 2–1. In 1996, he signed with the Edmonton Drillers of the National Professional Soccer League. During his tenure with Edmonton he served with the club for four seasons and appeared in 154 matches and recorded 12 goals. Overall he had a successful time with Edmonton finishing runners-up three times in their division, and winning the Conference title in the 1998/1999 season. In 1998, he signed with Hampton Roads Mariners of the USL A-League. He finished third in the Atlantic Division, and qualified for the postseason.

Campbell returned to St. Catharines for the 1999 season, but failed to clinch a postseason by finishing sixth in the standings. In 2000, he signed with Philadelphia KiXX where he appeared in 43 matches, and scored four goals. In the 2001/2002 indoor season, he was transferred to the Cleveland Crunch where he appeared in 17 matches, and recorded two goals. In 2003, he signed with Mississauga Olympians of the Canadian Professional Soccer League. During his time with Mississauga he failed to clinch a playoff berth by finishing sixth in the Western Conference. After retiring from competitive soccer he was hired assistant coach under Randy Ragan for the Guelph Gryphons women's soccer team.

References 

1972 births
Living people
Sportspeople from Guelph
Soccer people from Ontario
Canadian soccer coaches
Canadian soccer players
Canadian expatriate soccer players
Expatriate soccer players in the United States
Canadian expatriate sportspeople in the United States
St. Catharines Roma Wolves players
Edmonton Drillers (1996–2000) players
Virginia Beach Mariners players
Philadelphia KiXX (NPSL) players
Philadelphia KiXX (2001–2008 MISL) players
Cleveland Crunch (2001–2002 MISL) players
Toronto (Mississauga) Olympians players
National Professional Soccer League (1984–2001) players
A-League (1995–2004) players
Canadian Soccer League (1998–present) players
Major Indoor Soccer League (2001–2008) players
Canadian National Soccer League players
Association football defenders
Guelph Gryphons men's soccer coaches